Larry L. Flowers is a former Republican member of the Ohio House of Representatives, representing the 19th District from 2001 to 2008.  He currently is serving as the fire marshal for the state of Ohio.

External links
The Ohio Senate - Larry L. Flowers official OH House website
Project Vote Smart - Representative Larry L. Flowers (OH) profile
Follow the Money - Larry L. Flowers
2006 2004 2002 2000 campaign contributions

Republican Party members of the Ohio House of Representatives
1952 births
Living people
Politicians from Newark, Ohio
21st-century American politicians